Penhammus pauper is a species of beetle in the family Cerambycidae, and the sole member of the genus Penhammus. It was described by Kolbe in 1894.

References

Lamiini
Beetles described in 1894